The Japanese Garden is a park located in Sector 31 in union territory of Chandigarh. Built in 2014 on 13 acres of Land, by Indian Government, it was inaugurated by Shivraj Patil on 7 November 2

014. It consists of water bodies, pagoda towers, water falls, meditation centre, a buddha idol and golden bamboos. This is first ever garden in Chandigarh with Japanese touch. The garden has been developed at a cost of Rs 6 crore.

The Japanese Garden consists of two phases. The Phase-1 was inaugurated on 7 November 2014 and the Phase-2 of the park was opened to public on 4 June 2016. Both the phases of the park are connected by a tunnel decorated by beautiful Japanese paintings on both sides. The garden is designed using Japanese architecture and each of the elements in the garden is given a unique Japanese touch.

Image Gallery

References

External links
 Chandigarh Photos: Japanese Garden 
 Japanese Garden Chandigarh - A Photo Blog

See also 
 Rock Garden of Chandigarh
 Zakir Hussain Rose Garden

Gardens in India
Parks in Chandigarh
Geography of Chandigarh